Alonzo Poulton (28 March 1890 – 1966), sometimes known as Jerry Poulton or Olly Poulton, was an English professional footballer who played as a forward in the Football League for Bristol City, Reading, Middlesbrough and West Bromwich Albion.

Personal life 
Poulton served as a private in the Football Battalion of the Middlesex Regiment during the First World War.

Career statistics

References

English footballers
English Football League players
Association football inside forwards
West Bromwich Albion F.C. players
1890 births
Footballers from Wolverhampton
British Army personnel of World War I
Middlesex Regiment soldiers
Worcester City F.C. players
Merthyr Town F.C. players
Middlesbrough F.C. players
1966 deaths
Bristol City F.C. players
Reading F.C. players
Llanelli Town A.F.C. players
Southern Football League players
Date of death missing
Military personnel from Staffordshire

Oakengates Athletic F.C. players